Gilbertnixonius is a genus of braconid wasps in the family Braconidae. There is at least one described species in Gilbertnixonius, G. biem, found in Thailand.

References

Further reading

 
 
 

Microgastrinae